Nienna is a genus of proturans in the family Acerentomidae.

Species
 Nienna parvula Szeptycki, 1988

References

Protura